is a passenger railway station located in the city of Kōnosu, Saitama, Japan, operated by East Japan Railway Company (JR East) .

Lines
Kita-Kōnosu Station is served by the Takasaki Line, with through Shōnan-Shinjuku Line and Ueno-Tokyo Line services to and from the Tōkaidō Line.

Station layout
The station has a single island platform serving two tracks, with an elevated station building located above the platforms. The station is staffed.

Platforms

History 
The station opened on 3 November 1984. The station became part of the JR East network after the privatization of Japanese National Railways (JNR) on 1 April 1987.

Passenger statistics
In fiscal 2019, the station was used by an average of 7,224 passengers daily (boarding passengers only).

Surrounding area
Kita-Kōnosu Post Office
Akamidai Dai-Ichi Elementary School
Akamidai Dai-Ni Elementary School

See also
List of railway stations in Japan

References

External links

JR East Kita-Kōnosu Station

Railway stations in Japan opened in 1984
Takasaki Line
Stations of East Japan Railway Company
Railway stations in Saitama Prefecture
Shōnan-Shinjuku Line
Kōnosu